Raquel Nazzarena Alessi (born March 7, 1983) is an American former actress and model who starred on the FOX series Standoff She portrays the title character in the 2009 film Miss March, alongside Zach Cregger and Trevor Moore from the comedy troupe The Whitest Kids U' Know.

Life and career
Alessi was born in Los Angeles, California. She attended Marymount High School in Los Angeles, and later moved on to develop her acting talents at New York University, where she studied theater performance. While at the college she appeared in several plays including King Lear and Uncle Vanya. After attending college, Alessi landed a small role in Carlito's Way: Rise to Power.

In 2007, she was cast in a featured role in the Marvel Comic's superhero film Ghost Rider. Alessi was cast as the younger version of the character Roxanne Simpson, which would be played later in the movie by Eva Mendes. She is widely recognized for her role as Lia Mathers in the FOX television show Standoff. She was also named to Maxim's Hot 100 where she was voted #88 in 2007.

Filmography
Actress
 Castle .... Selena Rigas (1 episode, 2013)
 How I Met Your Mother .... Roberta (1 episode, 2009)
 CSI: NY .... Brooke Hallworth (1 episode, 2009)
 Miss March (2009) .... Cindi Whitehall
 Summerhood (2008) .... Cinnamon
 Standoff .... Lia Mathers (18 episodes, 2006–2007)
 Ghost Rider (2007) .... Young Roxanne Simpson
 Carlito's Way: Rise to Power (2005) (V) .... Rocco's Date
 Uncle Sam (1996) (as Raquel Allessi) .... Girl Student
 Lucky Chances (1990) TV mini-series .... Maria - Age 6
 Kidsongs .... Herself (Kidsongs Kid) (2 VHS episodes (where she appeared with Terrance Williams (former dancer)) (born 1979) "A Day At Camp" (1989) (where she appeared with Amaris "Ingrid" Dupree (former dancer) and Josh Keaton) and  "Ride the Roller Coaster" (1990) (where she appeared with Josh Keaton and Kenny Ford, Jr. (former keytarist/singer) (born 1977))

Miscellaneous Crew
 Dig It! (2011) (production assistant)

Self
 Up Close with Carrie Keagan .... Herself (2 episodes, 2009)

References

External links
 

1983 births
Living people
Actresses from Los Angeles
American film actresses
American television actresses
American child actresses
20th-century American actresses
21st-century American actresses